Otis Smith may refer to:

Otis Smith (American football), American football player
Otis Smith (basketball), American basketball player
Otis Smith (tennis), American tennis player
Otis M. Smith, justice on the Michigan Supreme Court